Umm al-Amad may refer to:

 Umm al-Amad, Al-Mukharram, a village in Homs Governorate, Syria
 Umm al-Amad, Hama, a village in Hama District, Hama Governorate, Syria
 Umm al-Amad, Salamiyah, a village in Salamiyah District, Hama Governorate, Syria
 Alonei Abba, formerly called  Umm el Amad
 Umm al-Amad, Lebanon, an archaeological site